The Medium Tactical Vehicle Replacement (MTVR) is a series of vehicles used by the U.S. Marines. The first MTVRs were delivered in late 1999. The MTVR is the equivalent of the U.S. Army’s Family of Medium Tactical Vehicles (FMTV); the Marines do not use the FMTV (with the exception of the FMTV-based HIMARS) and the Army does not use the MTVR.

There were originally four, later seven, MTVR variants, then nine (plus a sub-variant) as deliveries and development continued. A dedicated trailer and prototype/developmental MTVRs have also been produced.

The MTVR was designed and is manufactured by Oshkosh Defense.

Development and production history
The MTVR has its design origins in two U.S. military programs, the 5 ton Tactical Truck Replacement (5TTR) for the U.S. Army, and the Medium Tactical Vehicle Replacement (MTVR) for the U.S. Marines. The aim of these programs was to upgrade and extend the service life of around 3,400 U.S. Army M939 series 5 ton trucks, and 8,100 U.S. Marines M809 and M939 series 5 ton trucks. Prototype and development contracts for both programs were awarded in 1996. The 5TTR program was subsequently halted, and the MTVR program evolved from an upgrade to a new-build requirement.

Oshkosh was awarded a multi-year MTVR production contract in February 1999. The first vehicles were scheduled for delivery by the end of 1999, and deliveries under the initial contract concluded during August 2005. The award initially allowed for up to 8,168 MTVRs (including options for 2,502) in four variants (MK23, MK25, MK27, MK28) to be ordered over five program years; 6,931 MTVRs were delivered, 6,393 to the Marines and 538 to the Navy (Seabees). The first MTVRs were fielded in July 2001. Three additional variants followed, the MK29, MK30 and MK36.

Under a separate contract, Oshkosh commenced production in July 2004 of a further MTVR variant, the MK37. Based on the MK27 and fitted with a rear-mounted Hiab materials handling crane rated at 10,000 lb at 10.5 ft maximum reach, the MK37 is a resupply vehicle for the U.S. Marines HIgh Mobility Artillery Rocket System (HIMARS). The companion trailer is designated MK38.

Oshkosh was awarded a second MTVR multi-year contract (FY05-FY10) in July 2004. This award initially covered only potential Foreign Military Sales (FMS), plus the continuing requirements of the U.S. Navy. Ultimately the U.S. Navy and Marines combined received >2,000 vehicles under this contract.

In 2005, the MK31 Medium Equipment Transporter (MET) tractor entered service with Seabees, and later in the year with the Marines.

The MK28C is a variant of the MK28. The MK28C (C - chassis) replaced Special Purpose Vehicle (SPV) types, these based on a mix of tactical and commercial truck chassis and including: water distributor, 2,000 US gallon; fuel, 1,500 US gallon; field service; asphalt distributor; earth auger. Interchangeable commercial-off-the-shelf (COTS) - or modified COTS - bodies are fitted to MK28C chassis as field circumstances dictate.

Also in 2005, Oshkosh was awarded a contract to re-manufacture an initial 27 MTVRs to new configuration and with a full new vehicle warranty.

On 16 May 2008 the 10,000th MTVR was completed. By late 2011 an estimated 11,135 MTVRs had been ordered, that figure including 9,221 for the USMC and 1,855 for the Navy.

In FY12 the third (and final) five-year multi-year MTVR contract was awarded to Oshkosh. The final known MTVR delivery order (US$67 m for 338 vehicles; 278 Marines, 60 Seabees) was placed in September 2012, and inclusive of this order 11,359 MTVRs were ordered by the US Marines', about 1900 of these for the Navy. Orders under the final contract could be placed until June 2016.

In conjunction with Pierce Manufacturing (an Oshkosh Corporation company), Oshkosh developed the MTVR MK23/25-based Hawk Extreme, a wildland firefighting water tender. This product has been sold commercially.

Technical description

All production versions of the MTVR are based on the same 6×6 drive configuration and utilize a chassis constructed using bolted / huck-bolted, formed channel (9.75 × 3 × 0.38 in) made of heat-treated carbon manganese steel with a yield strength of 110,000 psi minimum. The engine is located under a forward fibreglass hood. The cab seats three and is of welded aluminium extrusion construction with adhesive bonded aluminium skins. The cab folds down to reduce overall height to 98 in and from mid-2007, production vehicles are armor-ready and have air-conditioning, revised cab mounts and upgraded cab suspension.

With the exception of the UK's Wheeled Tanker variants, all MTVRs are powered by a Caterpillar C-12, Advanced Diesel Engine Management (ADEM) III 11.9-litre six-cylinder diesel engine that develops 425 hp at 1,800 rpm and 1,550 ft-lb of torque at 1,200 rpm. When the central tire inflation system (CTIS) is set at 0 to 2 tons payload, engine power output is automatically reduced by around 20%. Driveline is completed by an Allison HD 4070P seven-speed automatic transmission, TC-541 torque converter and an Oshkosh 30000 Series single-speed transfer case. All-wheel drive is permanent and under highway driving conditions the torque split is 32% front, 68% rear.

Oshkosh TAK-4 independent coil spring suspension is fitted to the MTVR, this providing each front wheel with a total vertical travel of 16.0 in and a travel of 12.8 in on the rear axles. The front axle is rated at 16,000 lb, the second at 23,500 lb, the third at 25,400 lb. The MK36 wrecker and MK31 tractor variants have Hendrickson hydraulic suspension on the rear axles.

Standard tires fitted to the MTVR are Michelin 1600 R20 XZL and with the exception of the MK36 wrecker variant, no spare is carried. Compensating for no spare is a runflat setting option on the CTIS. CTIS allows the driver to adjust tire pressures to suit both payload and terrain conditions, from the driving seat. The two-piece bolt-together steel wheel rims are fitted with beadlocks for extreme low-pressure operations and tires will remain seated at pressures down to 10 psi. In the event that any one tire should fail totally, a limp-home facility allows for a second axle suspension unit to be raised and secured.

Mobility parameters include a climatic operational range of -50 °F to 125 °F. The MTVR has a maximum speed of 65 mph and on-road cruising range of 300 mi. It can climb a 60% gradient and traverse a 40% side slope with its maximum cross-country load. It can ford 60in of water. Turning radius and approach, departure, and ramp breakover angles vary by variant.

MTVR variants can be internally transported by C-5, C-17 and C-130 Hercules transport aircraft. The MK23 can be transported underslung by CH-53 helicopter.

The original MTVR trailer was designed and developed by Oshkosh to provide a matching trailer for the MTVR truck. Two prototype MTVR trailers were manufactured and tested between May 2000 and March 2001. In June 2005 the U.S. Marine Corps System Command (MARCORSYSCOM) awarded the Choctaw Manufacturing and Developing Corporation (CMDC) a $1.9 million Small Business Sole Source design and development contract for the MTVR Trailer. Oshkosh manufactures and supplies the associated trailers for the MK37 HIMARS resupply variant.

MTVR Armor Systems (MAS)
Oshkosh promotes the current MTVR armor packages as the MTVR Armor Systems (MAS). The current Standard MAS with Survivability Upgrade (MAS-SU) kit is available for a variety of models. The Reducible Height MAS (MAS-RH) is also available. Installation of armor requires a vehicle front axle and cab suspension mount upgrade, plus a revision to the cab roof gun mount. Air-conditioning is also fitted. From mid-2007 all production MTVRs have been armor ready, these modifications now forming part of the standard vehicle specification.

Development of a protection kit for the MTVR commenced in 2003, with the first production contract awarded in 2004 and calling for 920 baseline appliqué APKs for the cab, plus 460 modular armored rear troop carrier compartments. The cab and troop carrier kits, while complementary, are separate units and can be installed as such. A follow-on contract for 930 cab kits and 465 rear troop-carrier compartments was awarded in 2005. Two further contracts for a total of 293 cab kits were awarded in 2007. Oshkosh announced in August 2008 an initial contract award for height reducible armor kits for MVTRs. Around 2400 height reducible armor kits for MVTRs have been ordered. Additional awards for armor/protection-related upgrades have been made.

A small arms fire and mine blast protection kit for the U.K. MoD's MTVR-fronted Wheeled Tanker fleet has been developed and fitted to vehicles used on overseas operations.

Gallery

Prototype and developmental MTVRs
 Two each of 6×6 and 8×8 prototypes with Hiab load handling systems have been built. The 6×6 chassis are 9/14 ton (8,165/12,701 kg) on-/off-road rated, while the two 8×8 prototypes are rated at 16.5 tons (14,967 kg) and 15,000 kg payload. Both 8×8 chassis are fitted with a tridem rear axle layout, the rear axles (of which axles three and four steer) sprung hydraulically.
 Two 4×4 variants have been developed, the Short Bed Cargo Truck and Lightweight Cargo Truck. The Short Bed Cargo Truck has a high degree of commonality with the 6x6 MTVR, while the Lightweight truck is aimed at the opposite end of the payload/capability scale, this variant being fitted with beam-type axles and a simpler leaf spring (front) and airbag (rear) suspension set-up.
 A four-door crew-cab option is available for longer wheelbase chassis.
 A European-friendly forward control (with the engine mounted behind the cab) variant of the MTVR, designated as Z Series, has been built.
  In July 2005, Oshkosh was awarded a five-month contract from the Office of Naval Research for the first phase of a four-phase project to develop an MTVR with a 60 kW on-board power generating capability.
 Together with a selection of industry partners, Oshkosh has developed the MTVR-based TerraMax, an autonomous vehicle equipped with an extensive array of sensors, cameras and navigational computers.
 The Bull MRAP is based on the MTVR. In October 2007 Ideal Innovations Inc., Oshkosh Truck Corporation, and Ceradyne Inc. announced that they had delivered Category I and Category II MRAP II vehicles to the US Army Aberdeen Test Centre for further service evaluation. Ultimately no orders for any MRAP II vehicles were placed

Operators and details

  (limited evidence)
  - 73: 18 MK27 chassis were delivered to ELBO (Hellenic Vehicle Industry) during 2004. A further 15 MK27 chassis were delivered during 2005, and during October 2006 a further 40 MK27 chassis were delivered. Initial deliveries (2004/2005) are fitted with medium recovery equipment supplied by Eyal of Israel, while the October 2006 delivery are fitted out as ammunition transporter vehicles to operate alongside the Hellenic Army's Leopard MBTs
 
  - 357:  In March 2003 the UK became the first export customer for the MTVR. The Wheeled Tanker contract is valued at approximately £160 million (US$250 million) for initial vehicle acquisition and support over 15 years. The contract called for 218 Close Support Tankers (CSTs) (fuel); 82 Tactical Aircraft Refuellers (TARs) and 48 CSTs (water); a contract option for an additional nine CST (water) has been exercised
  - 11,359 delivered the United States Marine Corps and Navy Seabees (contract details in main article)

See also
Family of Medium Tactical Vehicles - equivalent truck in U.S. Army service
M939 series trucks - previous U.S. Marines 5-ton truck; replaced by MTVR
M809 series trucks  previous U.S. Marines 5-ton truck; replaced by MTVR (remained in use alongside successor M939 series)
M35 series trucks - previous U.S. Army/Marines 2.5-ton truck
Logistics Vehicle System (LVS) - U.S. Marines heavy truck; replaced by Oshkosh LVSR
Oshkosh Logistic Vehicle System Replacement (LVSR) - replaced LVS
Heavy Expanded Mobility Tactical Truck - U.S. Army heavy truck
Palletized Load System
Leyland 4-tonne truck - British Army truck used for similar roles; replaced by RMMV HX range
RMMV HX range of trucks
Navistar 7000 series - based on International Workstar chassis
Oshkosh M-ATV

Further reading
 Encyclopedia Of Modern Us Military Tactical Vehicles (pages 54–55), Carl Schulze/Tankograd  Encyclopedia of Modern U.S. Military Tactical Vehicles
 Jane's Land Warfare Platforms 2015-2016: Logistics, Support & Unmanned 
 Jane's Land Warfare Platforms 2014 - 2015: Logistics, Support & Unmanned  Jane’s Land Warfare Platforms: Logistics, Support & Unmanned 2014 - 2015
 Jane's Military Vehicles & Logistics 1998 - 1999 
 Medium Tactical Vehicle Replacement (MTVR) TP-94-01, Transportability Testing Procedures Paperback  – 2001

References

External links

 Oshkosh Defense MTVR portal
 Oshkosh MTVR Heavy Utility Truck
 TerraMax; autonomous MTVR
 TerraMax MTVR vs. Range Rover (Top Gear)
 Additional information at Globalsecurity.org

All-wheel-drive vehicles
Military trucks of the United States
Military vehicles introduced in the 1990s
Off-road vehicles
United States Marine Corps equipment
Oshkosh vehicles